Vladislav Igorevich Samko (born 3 January 2002) is a Russian football player who plays for FC Krasnodar and FC Krasnodar-2.

Club career
He made his debut in the Russian Football National League for FC Krasnodar-2 on 17 July 2021 in a game against FC Alania Vladikavkaz.

He made his Russian Premier League debut for FC Krasnodar on 17 April 2022 against PFC Krylia Sovetov Samara.

Career statistics

References

External links
 
 
 

2002 births
Living people
Russian footballers
Association football forwards
FC Krasnodar-2 players
FC Krasnodar players
Russian Second League players
Russian First League players
Russian Premier League players